Keshwar Persaud (born 23 December 1958) is a Guyanese cricketer. He played in eight first-class and four List A matches for Guyana from 1978 to 1981.

See also
 List of Guyanese representative cricketers

References

External links
 

1958 births
Living people
Guyanese cricketers
Guyana cricketers
Sportspeople from Georgetown, Guyana